The Nădrab is a right tributary of the river Govăjdia in Romania. It flows into the Govăjdia in the village Govăjdia.

References

Rivers of Romania
Rivers of Hunedoara County